Lionel Charles Renwick Emmett (8 January 1913 – 9 August 1996) was an Indian physician and field hockey player who competed in the 1936 Summer Olympics. He was a member of the Indian field hockey team, which won the gold medal. He played one match as forward.

Emmett was born in India in 1913. He received medical training in Calcutta Medical College. He served as a medical officer is the Indian Army Corps in field hospitals in India and Burma. He rose to the rank of lieutenant colonel. Later, he practiced as a general practitioners in the tea plantations of Assam. Following his retirement, he went to England in 1960s. He patented an Intra uterine contraceptive device named Copper Omega. Also, he developed two more medical devices: the Emmett Thread Retriever and the Emmett Thread Detector.

References

External links

1913 births
1996 deaths
People from Amravati district
Field hockey players from Maharashtra
Olympic field hockey players of India
Field hockey players at the 1936 Summer Olympics
Indian male field hockey players
Olympic gold medalists for India
Anglo-Indian people
Olympic medalists in field hockey
Medalists at the 1936 Summer Olympics
Indian emigrants to England
British people of Anglo-Indian descent